Bikini Bloodbath is a 2006 comedy film that parodies the horror-slasher movies of the 1980s. Written and directed by Jonathan Gorman and Thomas Edward Seymour, the film focuses on a high school girls’ volleyball team that plans to host an end-of-semester party. Two members of the boys’ football team crash the party, but problems begin when the maniacal Chef Death, a serial killer portrayed by Rob Coz, who wields meat cleavers and culinary one-liners, interrupts the proceedings by slaying the partygoers.

Shot on locations across Connecticut in 2005, Bikini Bloodbath was planned as the first in an ongoing horror/comedy series.  The film was released on DVD in December 2007, and its sequels – Bikini Bloodbath Car Wash (named the "#1 Ridiculous(ly Awesome) Horror Movie Titles of all time in 2010 by Mark H. Harris, About.com Guide). and Bikini Bloodbath Christmas  are also out on DVD.  Co-director Seymour cited the Peter Jackson The Lord of the Rings trilogy for the inspiration of creating back-to-back films. Additional films in the Bikini Bloodbath series are being planned. Debbie Rochon stars in all three films as a volleyball coach. Other actors in the series include Lloyd Kaufman, Rachael Robbins, Monique GATA Dupree and Sheri Lynn.

Cast
 Debbie Rochon  as Miss Johnson
 Robert Cosgrove Jr.  as The Chef / William Leschenski (as Robert Cosgrove)
 Sheri Lynn  as Smelly Suzy (as Sheri Bomb)
 Russ Russo  as Mike M.
 Leah Ford  as Jenny
 Anna-Karin Eskilsson  as Sharon
 Katie Gil  as Portia
 Natasha Nielsen  as Tawny
 Olja Hrustic  as Ginger

References

External links 
 
Bikini Bloodbath Cashwash mentioned on Ellen!
 Bikini Bloodbath at Rotten Tomatoes
 Profile of the film's production in the Hartford Advocate
 Profile of the film series in Play New Haven
 “The Knights who say BIKINI: An Interview with Thomas Edward Seymour,” DVD Town, Dec 1, 2008

2006 films
Films shot in Connecticut
American comedy horror films
2000s parody films
Parodies of horror
2006 comedy horror films
Bikinis
2006 comedy films
2000s English-language films
2000s American films